The Little Professor is a backwards-functioning calculator designed for children ages 5 to 9. Instead of providing the answer to a mathematical expression entered by the user, it generates unsolved expressions and prompts the user for the answer.

Usage
When the user turns the Little Professor on and selects a difficulty level, an incomplete equation such as "3 x 6 =" appears on the LED screen. The user has three chances to enter the correct number. If the answer is incorrect, the screen displays "EEE". After the third wrong answer, the correct answer is displayed. If the answer supplied is correct, the Little Professor goes to the next equation. The Little Professor displays the number of correct first answers after each set of 10 problems. The device is powered by a 9-volt battery.

History
The Little Professor was first released by Texas Instruments on June 13, 1976. As the first electronic educational toy, the Little Professor is a common item on calculator collectors' lists. 

In 1976, the Little Professor cost less than $20. More than 1 million units sold in 1977.

The second generation Little Professor was designed by Mark Bailey whilst working for Raffo and Pape. In a brief interview in 2013 Bailey stated 'I've designed everything from private jets to pregnancy tests but Little Professor remains the highlight of my career.'

A  solar version of Little Professor was introduced during the 2000s.

An emulator of the Little Professor for Android was published in 2012.

In 2015, the MESS emulator also included the original Little Professor as a sort of pack-in.

See also
Dataman

References

External links
 Little Professor – presented by James Grime and Brady Haran, (Mathematical Sciences Research Institute)
 Little Professor Solar – on TI.com
Texas Instruments calculators
Texas Instruments hardware